Charu Sharma is an Indian commentator, compere and quizmaster. He is the director of the Pro Kabaddi League.

He was the CEO of the Royal Challengers Bangalore cricket team for the 2008 Indian Premier League but was forced to leave due to the team's poor performance in the inaugural season. Even though the Royal Challengers officials said that Sharma resigned by himself, he contradicted them by saying that he was sacked by United Breweries Limited on behalf of Vijay Mallya, the team's owner.

Sharma was the stand-in auctioneer at the 2022 Indian Premier League auction, after Hugh Edmeades, the original auctioneer collapsed due to postural hypotension. Sharma conducted the auction after lunch on the first day, and continued till the last session on the next day, when Edmeades returned.

Career
Charu Sharma  is  well known for his television presentations (especially on cricket) along with Mandira Bedi. He is also known as a quizmaster in television programmes and other event. He regularly hosts award shows, corporate events and contributes to teamwork and leadership seminar. His father was the educationist Mr N.C. Sharma, a former vice-principal of Mayo College, Ajmer,

When The Economic Times talked to him about the IPL controversy he said,"I think I worked very hard for it, probably the hardest ever. Few matches were lost earlier and so heads were lost too. I like to believe that I was in the line of the steam of a pressure cooker that was waiting to release."

Pro Kabaddi 
The Pro Kabaddi League is a professional kabaddi league founded in 2014. It is formulated as an eight-city league played in a "caravan format," traveling together to all 8 venues to play a total of 60 Matches. It is an initiative of Mashal Sports, a company which was co-founded by Anand Mahindra and Sharma, who is also a director of Mashal Sports. Star India acquired a 74% stake in Mashal Sports, and now has control over the entire league as a majority owner of Mashal Sports. Mashal Sports has acquired the rights to organize the league for a period of 10 years from International Kabaddi Federation (IKF) with an option to renew it further.

Coca-Cola Bahrain Premier League 2018
Charu Sharma was among the invitees to promote cricket in Bahrain and held the finals of Coca-Cola Bahrain Premier League Quiz 2018.

References

Indian Premier League
Indian cricket commentators
Living people
Indian sports broadcasters
Year of birth missing (living people)